A guide book or travel guide is "a book of information about a place designed for the use of visitors or tourists". It will usually include information about sights, accommodation, restaurants, transportation, and activities. Maps of varying detail and historical and cultural information are often included. Different kinds of guide books exist, focusing on different aspects of travel, from adventure travel to relaxation, or aimed at travelers with different incomes, or focusing on sexual orientation or types of diet.

Travel guides or guide book can also take the form of travel websites.

History

Antiquity 
A forerunner of the guidebook was the periplus, an itinerary from landmark to landmark of the ports along a coast. A periplus such as the Periplus of the Erythraean Sea was a manuscript document that listed, in order, the ports and coastal landmarks, with approximate intervening distances, that the captain of a vessel could expect to find along a shore. This work was possibly written in the middle of the 1st century CE. It served the same purpose as the later Roman itinerarium of road stops.

The periegesis, or "progress around" was an established literary genre during the Hellenistic age. A lost work by Agaclytus describing Olympia is referred to by the Suda and Photius. Dionysius Periegetes (literally, Dionysius the Traveller) was the author of a description of the habitable world in Greek hexameter verse written in a terse and elegant style, intended for the klismos traveller rather than the actual tourist on the ground; he is believed to have worked in Alexandria and to have flourished around the time of Hadrian. An early "remarkably well-informed and interesting guidebook" was the Hellados Periegesis (Descriptions of Greece) of Pausanias of the 2nd century A.D. This most famous work is a guide to the interesting places, works of architecture, sculpture, and curious customs of Ancient Greece, and is still useful to Classicists today. With the advent of Christianity, the guide for the European religious pilgrim became a useful guidebook. An early account is that of the pilgrim Egeria, who visited the Holy Land in the 4th century CE and left a detailed itinerary.

In the medieval Arab world, guide books for travelers in search of artifacts and treasures were written by Arabic treasure hunters, magicians, and alchemists. This was particularly the case in Arab Egypt, where treasure hunters were eager to find valuable ancient Egyptian antiquities. Some of the books claimed to be imbued with magic that could dispel the magical barriers believed to be protecting the artifacts.

Travelogues
Travel literature became popular during the Song Dynasty (960–1279) of medieval China. The genre was called 'travel record literature' (youji wenxue), and was often written in narrative, prose, essay and diary style. Travel literature authors such as Fan Chengda (1126–1193) and Xu Xiake (1587–1641) incorporated a wealth of geographical and topographical information into their writing, while the 'daytrip essay' Record of Stone Bell Mountain by the noted poet and statesman Su Shi (1037–1101) presented a philosophical and moral argument as its central purpose.

In the West, the guidebook developed from the published personal experiences of aristocrats who traveled through Europe on the Grand Tour. As the appreciation of art, architecture and antiquity became ever-more essential ingredients of the noble upbringing so they predominated in the guidebooks, particularly those devoted to the Italian peninsula. Richard Lassels (1603–1668) wrote a series of manuscript guides which were eventually published posthumously in Paris and London (1670) as The Voyage of Italy. Grand Tour guidebooks poured off the presses throughout the eighteenth century, those such as Patrick Brydone's A Tour Through Sicily and Malta being read by many who never left England. 

Between 1626 and 1649, the Dutch publisher, Officina Elzeviriana (House of Elzevir), published a bestselling pocketbook series, the Respublicae Elzevirianae (Elzevirian Republics), which has been described as the "ancestor of the modern travel guide". Each volume gave information (geography, population, economy, history) on a country in Europe, Africa, the Near East or the Far East.

An important transitional figure from the idiosyncratic style of the Grand Tour travelogues to the more informative and impersonal guidebook was Mariana Starke. Her 1824 guide to travel in France and Italy served as an essential companion for British travelers to the Continent in the early 19th century. She recognized that with the growing numbers of Britons traveling abroad after 1815 the majority of her readers would now be in family groups and on a budget. She therefore included for the first time a wealth of advice on luggage, obtaining passports, the precise cost of food and accommodation in each city and even advice on the care of invalid family members. She also devised a system of !!! exclamation mark ratings, a forerunner of today's star ratings. Her books, published by John Murray, served as a template for later guides.

In the United States, the first published guidebook was Gideon Minor Davison's The Fashionable Tour, published in 1822, and Theodore Dwight's The Northern Traveller and Henry Gilpin's The Northern Tour, both from 1825.

Modern guidebook

The modern guidebook emerged in the 1830s, with the burgeoning market for long distance tourism. The publisher John Murray began printing the Murray's Handbooks for Travellers in London from 1836. The series covered tourist destinations in Europe, Asia and northern Africa, and he introduced the concept of "sights" which he rated in terms of their significance using stars for Starke's exclamation points. According to scholar James Buzard, the Murray style "exemplified the exhaustive rational planning that was as much an ideal of the emerging tourist industry as it was of British commercial and industrial organization generally."

In Germany, Karl Baedeker acquired the publishing house of Franz Friedrich Röhling in Koblenz, which in 1828 had published a handbook for travellers by Professor Johannes August Klein entitled Rheinreise von Mainz bis Cöln; ein Handbuch für Schnellreisende (A Rhine Journey from Mainz to Cologne; A Handbook for Travellers on the Move). He published this book with little changes for the next ten years, which provided the seeds for Baedeker's new approach to travel guides. After Klein died, he decided to publish a new edition in 1839, to which he added many of his own ideas on what he thought a travel guide should offer the traveller. Baedeker's ultimate aim was to free the traveller from having to look for information anywhere outside the travel guide; whether about routes, transport, accommodation, restaurants, tipping, sights, walks or prices. Baedeker emulated the style of John Murray's guidebooks, but included unprecedented detailed information.

In 1846, Baedeker introduced his star ratings for sights, attractions and lodgings, following Mrs. Starke's and Murray's. This edition was also his first 'experimental' red guide. He also decided to call his travel guides 'handbooks', following the example of John Murray III. Baedeker's early guides had tan covers, but from 1856 onwards, Murray's red bindings and gilt lettering became the familiar hallmark of all Baedeker guides as well, and the content became famous for its clarity, detail and accuracy.

Baedeker and Murray produced impersonal, objective guides; works prior to this combined factual information and personal sentimental reflection. The availability of the books by Baedeker and Murray helped sharpen and formalize the complementary genre of the personal travelogue, which was freed from the burden of serving as a guide book. The Baedeker and Murray guide books were hugely popular and were standard resources for travelers well into the 20th century. As William Wetmore Story said in the 1860s, "Every Englishman abroad carries a Murray for information, and a Byron for sentiment, and finds out by them what he is to know and feel by every step." 

After Karl Baedeker died, his son, also named Karl, inherited the Baedeker travel guide business; however, he was killed in action during World War I. British nationalism and anti-German sentiment resulted in some British people labeling Baedeker guides "instrumental to the German war effort", and their popularity in the United Kingdom dropped considerably. As a result, the two editors of Baedeker's English-language titles left the company and acquired the rights to Murray's Handbooks. The resulting guide books, called the Blue Guides to distinguish them from the red-covered Baedekers, constituted one of the major guide book series for much of the 20th century and are still published today.

Post-WW2

Soon after World War II, two new names emerged which combined European and American perspectives on international travel. Eugene Fodor, a Hungarian-born author of travel articles, who had emigrated to the United States before the war, wrote guidebooks which introduced English-reading audiences to continental Europe. Arthur Frommer, an American soldier stationed in Europe during the Korean War, used his experience traveling around the Continent as the basis for Europe on $5 a Day (1957), which introduced readers to options for budget travel in Europe. Both authors' guidebooks became the foundations for extensive series, eventually covering destinations around the world.

Since then, Let's Go, Lonely Planet, Insight Guides, Rough Guides, Eyewitness Travel Guides and many other travel guide series have been published.

For specific activities
Specialist guides for mountains have a long history owing to the special needs of mountaineering, climbing, hill walking and scrambling. The guides by W A Poucher for example, are widely used for the hill regions of Britain. There are many more special guides to the numerous climbing grounds in Britain published by the Climbers Club, for example.

Travel guides are made for diving destinations and specific dive sites. These have been published as magazine articles, stand-alone books and websites, often publicising the dive sites  in the vicinity of specific service providers.

Digital world
With the emergence of digital technology, many publishers turned to electronic distribution, either in addition to or instead of print publication.  This can take the form of downloadable documents for reading on a portable computer or hand held device such a PDA or iPod, or online information accessible via a web site.  This enabled guidebook publishers to keep their information more current.  Traditional guide book incumbents Lonely Planet, Frommers, Rough Guides, and In Your Pocket City Guides, and newcomers such as Schmap or Ulysses Travel Guides are now offering travel guides for download.  New online and interactive guides such as Tripadvisor, Wikivoyage, and Travellerspoint enable individual travelers to share their own experiences and contribute information to the guide.  Wikivoyage, CityLeaves, and Travellerspoint make the entire contents of their guides updatable by users, and make the information in their guides available as open content, free for others to use.

Guide book publishers
This list is a select sample of the full range of English language guide book publishers - either contemporary or historical.

 W.J. Adams
 AAA/CAA TourBook
 D. Appleton & Co.
 Baedeker
 Berlitz
 Adam and Charles Black
 Blue Guides
 Bradt
 Cicerone Press
 Citysearch
 Thomas Cook & Son
 DOM publishers
 DK Eyewitness Travel
 FalconGuides
 Fodor's
 For Dummies
 Forbes Travel Guide
 Foursquare City Guide
 Footprint Books
 Frommer's
 Green Book - specialized for Negro car drivers in segregated America
 Harper & Brothers
 Insight Guides
 In Your Pocket
 Let's Go
 Lonely Planet
 Michelin Guide - specialized in restaurants
 Moon Handbooks
 John Murray
 National Geographic Traveler
 Nicholson Guides
 Not For Tourists
 Rick Steves
 Rough Guides
 Spartacus International Gay Guide - specialized in gay tourists
 Spotted by Locals
 Time Out
 Touring Club Italiano  - covering tourism in Italy
 Vinologue
 Wallpaper City Guides
 Ward Lock & Co.
 Weird US
 Wikivoyage - edited by users
 wordtravels.com

See also

 (for academic 'Guide Books' i.e. brief reference works)
 (selective guide to print and online reference sources)

References 

 Guide book
Guide book
Travel gear
Non-fiction genres